Biosensors International Group is a medical device company that specializes in developing, manufacturing and licensing technologies for  use in interventional cardiology procedures and critical care. The company was listed in the Mainboard of the Singapore Exchange (SGX) in May 2005. The global headquarters of the company are located in Singapore, where the main manufacturing facilities and R&D centers are hosted. The European headquarters are in Morges, Switzerland; this Swiss office is also the Legal Manufacturer of BioMatrix, the current leading product of the company.

BioMatrix is a drug-eluting stent that utilizes proprietary technologies of Biosensors:
 a biodegradable Poly-Lactic Acid (PLA) polymer (PLA), which degrades into the naturally occurring lactic acid
 the Biolimus A9 drug, a highly lipophilic derivative of sirolimus
 the S-Stent stent platform
 an automated stent coating technology that directly deposits the coating onto the stent surface.
Biosensors has obtained CE Mark for this drug-eluting stent product in January 2008.

To enter the China market, Biosensors has set up a joint-venture with Hong Kong listed Shandong Weigao to market and distribute coronary stents in China.

As one of the few companies with proprietary drug-eluting stent technology, Biosensors also has been obtaining revenue through licensing its technologies to other medical device companies like Terumo, and specialty-stent providers like Devax, Inc. and Xtent, Inc.

See also 
 Drug-eluting stent
 Biolimus A9

Notes

External links
 Biosensors International Website

Biosensors
Health care companies of Singapore
Companies listed on the Singapore Exchange
Singaporean brands